  
Moortown is a hamlet in the civil parish of South Kelsey, and in the West Lindsey district of Lincolnshire, England. The population is included in the civil parish of South Kelsey.

The nearest primary school is in North Kelsey and the nearest secondary schools are in Caistor. Moortown has a public house, The Skipworth Arms, a campsite, bus shelter, and a letterbox.

Previously there was a Victorian railway station (opposite the Skipworth Arms) from which trains to Lincoln and Grimsby ran. There are weekday bus services to Brigg and Scunthorpe.

Golden Jubilee

In 2002 village residents marked the Golden Jubilee of Elizabeth II. There was a Jubilee Day event and a permanent memorial constructed, the latter a decorative sign with brass plaque adjacent to an existing Silver Jubilee bench.

References

External links

Villages in Lincolnshire
West Lindsey District